Cairngorm Lochs is a protected wetland area in the Cairngorms,  in the Grampian and Highland regions of Scotland. With a total area of 173 hectares, it covers five freshwater lochs which are among the highest areas of standing water in the UK. It has been protected as a Ramsar Site since 1981.

The site is composed of five separate lochs: Etchachan, Uiane, Coire an Lochain, Avon and Einich. All five lakes are extremely oligotrophic and support highly specialized populations of zooplankton and phytoplankton; the two largest also support plant populations including Littorella uniflora, Lobelia dortmanna and Juncus bulbosus.

As well as being recognised as a wetland of international importance under the Ramsar Convention, the lochs are additionally protected as they all lie within the boundaries of the Cairngorms National Park.

References

Ramsar sites in Scotland
Wetlands of Scotland